Provinssirock is one of the biggest rock festivals in Finland. It takes place in the city of Seinäjoki in Southern Ostrobothnia, Western Finland. The two- or three-day festival, which starts the busy Finnish rock festival season, has been held every June since 1979.

The 2007 festival had a combined three-day total crowd of 55,000. In 2008 Provinssirock was organised on 13-15 June, and was sold out with a combined three-day total of 75,000 attendees watching bands and rock artists such as Foo Fighters, Linkin Park, Nightwish, The Sounds, Billy Talent and Serj Tankian. Provinssirock was also sold out in 2011, when there were over 84,000 attendees. Headliners were System of a Down, Avenged Sevenfold and Pendulum.

International performers that have previously performed at Provinssirock include:
Alice in Chains
Tori Amos
As I Lay Dying
Big Country
Brigada S
Bring Me the Horizon
David Bowie
Chimaira
The Cult
The Cure
The Pogues
De La Soul
Dream Theater
Faithless
Faith No More
Garbage
Hatebreed
HIM
Hüsker Dü
Kent
Lamb of God
Limp Bizkit
Lou Reed
Macklemore
Manic Street Preachers
Marilyn Manson
Massive Attack
Nine Inch Nails
Paramore
Placebo
Iggy Pop
The Prodigy
Rage Against the Machine
Rammstein
The Ramones
Red Hot Chili Peppers
R.E.M.
Scissor Sisters
Patti Smith
The Stone Roses
Suede
System of a Down
Tool
Turbonegro
Weezer
Within Temptation

References

External links

Homepage
 List of musicians and bands at Provinssirock 
Provinssirock 2012 on Choose Fest

Seinäjoki
Rock festivals in Finland
Music festivals established in 1979
Tourist attractions in South Ostrobothnia
Summer events in Finland
1979 establishments in Finland